Paul Braaten (23 March 1876 - 20 January 1963) was a Norwegian Nordic skier who won the Nordic combined at the Holmenkollen ski festival in 1899. Braaten also won the men's 30 km cross-country skiing events in 1900 and 1901. For his 1899 Nordic combined victory, Braaten earned the Holmenkollen medal (Shared with Robert Pehrson.)

References
Holmenkollen medalists - click Holmenkollmedaljen for downloadable pdf file 
Holmenkollen winners since 1892 - click Vinnere for downloadable pdf file 

Holmenkollen medalists
Holmenkollen Ski Festival winners
Norwegian male cross-country skiers
Norwegian male Nordic combined skiers
1876 births
1963 deaths